Annalisa Cochrane (born June 21, 1996) is an American actress. She first appeared onscreen in the television film The Bride He Bought Online (2015). She is known for her recurring role of Yasmine in the Netflix series Cobra Kai (2018–present) and her main role as Addy Prentiss in the critically praised Peacock series One of Us Is Lying (2021–2022).

Early life
Annalisa Cochrane was born on June 21, 1996, in the United States. Cochrane spent more than ten years of her childhood in Pune. She first expressed interest in acting after watching The Chronicles of Narnia: The Lion, the Witch and the Wardrobe (2005)—a film adaptation of C. S. Lewis's 1950 novel—at age eight. She stated: "Lucy Pevensie was played by a brunette ... but ... in all the illustrations I'd seen, she was blond and ... it just didn't sit right with me ... but from then on, I was like, I have to be an actor".

Career
Cochrane began acting professionally at age 17; her first role was in Lifetime television film The Bride He Bought Online (2015).

In October 2019, Cochrane was cast in Peacock's pilot for the mystery drama series One of Us Is Lying. Based on Karen M. McManus's 2017 novel of the same name, it follows a group of students who become murder suspects after the death of their classmate. Cochrane portrays Addy, a popular cheerleader who fears her life will be ruined if people knew her secrets. Before auditioning, Cochrane was aware of the novel since it was a New York Times Best Seller. Following her initial audition, she read the book, which helped her understand the character better: "It's everything. That first-person narrative gives you the blueprint for your entire character and world-building. I always say I feel like I cheated with the callbacks and the test because I had it right there. All the imagination work was almost done for me." The pilot was filmed in November. The show was later given a full series order, which was filmed in May 2021. One of Us Is Lying was released five months later to positive reviews and quickly garnered a devoted following. The Wall Street Journal described the actors as "very capable".

In January 2022, One of Us Is Lying was renewed for a second season, which was released on October 20. MEAWW considered the returning cast to be "phenomenal", and praised Cochrane—as well as co-stars Marianly Tejada, Chibuikem Uche, and Cooper van Grootel—for "steal[ing] the show".

Filmography

References

External links

Living people
1996 births
21st-century American actresses
Actresses from Pune
American film actresses
American television actresses
American web series actresses